The Kiss My Ass Tour was a concert tour by American rock band Kiss. It was the last tour to feature drummer Eric Singer as a member until 2004, and the last tour with guitarist Bruce Kulick.

Background
Kiss opened the tour with a performance at the WWBZ 103.5 Blazefest in Villa Park. In late August and early September 1994, Kiss toured South America as headliners on the touring Monsters of Rock festival alongside Slayer and Black Sabbath.

Following the Monsters of Rock tour, the band toured Japan in January 1995 on their own, and in February 1995 they toured Australia for the first time since 1980. During the Japan leg, the band had established the "Kiss Aid Save The City Fund", raising more than $10,000 for the survivors of the Great Hanshin earthquake in Kobe, Japan. The tour featured props like the Sphinx which returned from the Hot in the Shade Tour, fireworks, lasers, strippers and the giant logo with the band's name. During this tour, Kiss would also go on to host a tour of "Kiss conventions" at various hotels and convention centers to do what other fan-created Kiss conventions had done before. Following the tour, there was an exclusive performance in which the band performed an acoustic set on MTV for their live album Kiss Unplugged, joined by Ace Frehley and Peter Criss.

In the tour program for the band's final tour, Stanley reflected on the tour:

Setlist
This is an example setlist performed at a show, but may not represent the majority of the shows on this tour.
"Creatures of the Night"
"Deuce"
"Parasite"
"Unholy"
"I Stole Your Love"
"Cold Gin"
"Got To Choose"
"Firehouse"
"Calling Dr. Love"
"Makin' Love"
"I Was Made for Lovin' You"
"I Want You"
"Domino"
"Love Gun"
"Lick It Up"
"God of Thunder"
"I Love It Loud"
"Detroit Rock City"
"Black Diamond"
"Heaven's on Fire"
"Rock and Roll All Nite"

 "King of the Night Time World" opened shows on certain dates of the tour.
 "Goin' Blind" was played at the beginning of the tour but was abandoned by the set list.
 "Strutter" and "100,000 Years" were played occasionally.
 "She", "Forever", "Take It Off" and "God Gave Rock 'n' Roll to You II" were played occasionally on the tour.

Tour dates

Personnel 
 Paul Stanley – vocals, rhythm guitar
 Gene Simmons – vocals, bass
 Bruce Kulick – lead guitar, backing vocals
 Eric Singer – drums, backing vocals

References

Sources

1994 concert tours
1995 concert tours
Kiss (band) concert tours